Ancistrocarpus is a genus of flowering plants belonging to the family Malvaceae.

Its native range is Nigeria to Western Central Tropical Africa.

Species:
 Ancistrocarpus bequaertii De Wild. 
 Ancistrocarpus comperei R.Wilczek 
 Ancistrocarpus densispinosus Oliv.

References

Grewioideae
Malvaceae genera